DragonStrike or Dragon Strike may refer to:
 DragonStrike (video game), a computer game in which the player flew a dragon
 DragonStrike (board game), a board game intended to serve as an introduction to Dungeons & Dragons
 Dragon Strike (novel), a novel by  Humphrey Hawksley
Dragon Lord or Dragon Strike, a Jackie Chan film 
 Dragon Strike, an Age of Fire novel  by E. E. Knight